Scopolin is a glucoside of scopoletin formed by the action of the enzyme scopoletin glucosyltransferase. It occurs in Chamaemelum nobile.

References

Bibliography 

O-methylated coumarins
Phenol glucosides